Planes is a municipality in Spain. This hamlet lies in the Comtat region of the Spanish kingdom.

Notable people
 

Carlos Andrés y Morell (1753–1820) Spanish philosopher, lawyer, politician and writer

References

External links

Municipalities in the Province of Alicante